Elementary operations can refer to:
 the operations in elementary arithmetic: addition, subtraction, multiplication, division.
 elementary row operations or elementary column operations.